Brisaster owstoni is a species of sea urchins of the family Schizasteridae. Their armour is covered with spines. Brisaster owstoni was first scientifically described in 1950 by Ole Theodor Jensen Mortensen.

References 

owstoni
Taxa named by Ole Theodor Jensen Mortensen